{{DISPLAYTITLE:C17H20N4O2}}
The molecular formula C17H20N4O2 (molar mass: 312.366 g/mol, exact mass: 312.1586 u) may refer to:

 Azidomorphine
 Propamidine

Molecular formulas